Julieth de los Ángeles Arias Gutiérrez (born 6 December 1990) is a Costa Rican footballer who plays as a goalkeeper. She has been a member of the Costa Rica women's national team.

References

1990 births
Living people
Women's association football goalkeepers
Costa Rican women's footballers
Costa Rica women's international footballers
Pan American Games competitors for Costa Rica
Footballers at the 2011 Pan American Games
Central American Games gold medalists for Costa Rica
Central American Games medalists in football